Gonzalo Núñez (fl. 10591106) was an early member of the House of Lara, whom modern historians and genealogists agree is the first clearly identifiable member of this lineage. The House of Lara was a very prominent family of nobility in the kingdoms of Castile and León and several of its members played a prominent role in the history of medieval Spain. Possibly related to the Salvadórez, the sons of Salvador González and, by marriage, to the Alfonsos from Tierra de Campos and Liébana, as well as the Álvarez from Castile, Gonzalo was most probably a descendant of the Counts of Castile.

Debated origins
The filiation proposed by Luis de Salazar y Castro in his work on the House of Lara, has been accepted for centuries although several modern historians question its accuracy. According to Salazar y Castro, Gonzalo was the third member of this lineage with that name and was a descendant of the counts of Castile as the son of a Nuño or Munio González who would have been the son of Gonzalo Fernández, the first-born of count Fernán González. The author, however, confuses several namesakes, assuming that they are the same person, and does not provide any documentary evidence sustaining that filiation. Moreover, according to medieval charters, Gonzalo Fernández, the son of Fernán González, appears for the last time on 29 June 959 and in February 984 his widow, Fronilde Gómez, made a donation for the soul of her deceased husband to the Monastery of San Pedro de Cardeña and only mentions one son named Sancho.

Ramón Menéndez Pidal in La España del Cid  (1929) believed that Gonzalo Núñez was the son of a Munio or Nuño Salvadórez who would have been the brother of Gonzalo Salvadórez.  The historian María del Carmen Carlé in her work "Gran Propiedad y grandes propietarios" (1973) suggested a relationship with the Salvadórez.  According to her hypothesis, the relationship would be through Goto González, a daughter of Gonzalo Salvadórez and wife of Nuño Álvarez, who would have been the parents of Gonzalo Núñez de Lara. Nevertheless, according to several charters, Goto González Salvadórez was married to the Asturian count Fernando Díaz,  brother of  Jimena Díaz the wife of Rodrigo Díaz de Vivar. Nuño Álvarez, who died in 1065, was the tenente in Amaya and Carazo and his family owned properties in the land between the Arlanzón and the Duero rivers, which would explain the "power of the Lara in the region".

The historian Julia Montenegro in her study on the Monastery of Santa María la Real de Piasca documented a relationship with the lineage of the Alfonsos, the origin of the Osorios, Villalobos, and Froilaz. According to her hypothesis, Gutierre Alfonso and his wife Goto were the parents of María Gutiérrez who married the Castilian magnate Nuño Álvarez, and this couple would have been the parents of Gonzalo Núñez.

The medievalist scholar and professor Margarita Torres Sevilla-Quiñones de León agrees that there was in fact a relationship with the Alfonsos, nevertheless, she proves that María Gutiérrez and Nuño Álvarez were not Gonzalo's parents, but rather those of his wife Goto Núñez, as evidenced in a donation made in 1087 by Gonzalo, his wife Goto, and his sister-in-law Urraca to the Monastery of San Martín de Marmellar. A year later, the same Urraca mentioned in the previous charter made a donation to the same monastery of some properties that had belonged to her uncle Munio Álvarez and her mother María, daughter of Count Gutierre Alfonso. Urraca appears again in 1097 donating other properties to the Monasterio Real de San Benito in Sahagún, which was confirmed by Gonzalo Núñez, and, in 1088, jointly with her mother María Gutiérrez, she made another donation to the Monastery of San Millán de Suso of a property in Villa Fitero.

Another hypothesis on the filiation of Gonzalo Núñez de Lara is proposed by Margarita Torres who suggests that Gonzalo would be the son of a Munio González, son of Gonzalo García who, in turn, was the son of count García Fernández of Castile. Munio González, probably the count in Álava in the year 1030 was the brother of Salvador González, tenente in La Bureba, and this would explain the relationship between the Lara and the Salvadórez. Both brothers were vassals of king Sancho III of Navarre and Munio appears often in charters with his nephews Gonzalo and Álvaro Salvadórez.

Historians Gonzalo Martínez Díez and Carlos Estepa Díez disagree with the filiation proposed by Margarita Torres. Martínez Díez maintains that it is impossible to confirm the parentage of Gonzalo Núñez de Lara with the available medieval documentation. Estepa Díez stresses that the names "Munio" and "Nuño" are distinct and that even though these may be misspelled in some charters, the correct patronymics would be "Muñoz" (son of Munio) or "Núñez" (son of Nuño). Antonio Sánchez de Mora, however, believes that although the filiation of Gonzalo Núñez de Lara is still undefined, the hypothesis proposed by Margarita Torres is the one that is probably closest to the truth. The only filiation that seems to have been proven is that of Gonzalo's wife, Goto Núñez, as a member of the Alfonso and the Álvarez clans and that even though "there seems to be close ties between the Lara and the Salvadórez [...], documentary proof is still lacking in order to be able to determine the precise ancestry".

Biography

Gonzalo Núñez enjoyed the royal favor and "rose to great heights thanks to the largesse of the king". In 1098, Alfonso VI refers to Gonzalo in a donation to the Monastery of San Millán de Suso as his "well-loved Gonzalo Núñez". Even though he did not have the title of "count", he appears frequently in the documentation as a "senior", as was the case of other Castilian magnates of the 11th century. Besides confirming as senior Gondissalvo Nunnez, he also appears with the title of potestas and dominante Lara, the toponymic from which his lineage took its name although it was not until a century later that its members began to add "Lara" to their respective patronymics.

His presence in the curia regis is confirmed since 1059 when he appears confirming royal charters, often with Gonzalo Salvadórez, of Kings Fernando I, Sancho II, and Alfonso VI, although, in some cases, since the name of the land that they governed is not mentioned, it could refer to another namesake.

He governed several tenencias, including  Carazo, Huerta, Osma and Lara, the latter governed from 1081 until 1095. He owned estates in  Castilla la Vieja, Tierra de Campos and in Asturias, and held rights in Hortigüela, and in the towns of Duruelo de la Sierra and Covadela.

In 1093, he participated in a military campaign in Portugal and later in Huesca trying unsuccessfully to prevent the Almorávides from conquering the city In 1098 he played a key role in the repopulation of Almazán and Medinaceli after being reconquered in 1104 and also in  Andaluz, the latter probably held as part of his properties.

He was a patron of several monasteries and he and his wife Goto had close ties with the Monastery of Santa María la Real de Piasca which had been patronized by his wife's family, the Alfonso.  In a donation made in 1122, his son Rodrigo mentioned that the monastery had been built by his grandparents and that his parents had been its patrons: edificaberunt abios et patronos atque parentes nostros.

He last appears in medieval charters on 12 December 1105 at the Monastery of San Salvador de Oña and probably died shortly afterwards.

Marriage and issue

Gonzalo Núñez married  Goto Núñez, daughter of Nuño Álvarez and of María Gutiérrez, who was the daughter of Gutierre Alfonso, count in Grajal, and countess Goto, The documented offspring of this marriage were:

 Pedro González de Lara (died in 1130), one of the most powerful Castilian magnates of his time and lover of Queen Urraca with whom he had issue.
 Rodrigo González de Lara (died after 1144), count and a prominent member of the House of Lara. 
 Teresa González de Lara. In 1035, Gonzalo and Goto offered their daughter Teresa to the Royal Monastery of San Benito in Sahagún and to the Monastery of San Pedro de los Molinos, donating several properties most of which came from the Alfonso family. Teresa became a nun and was later the abbess at the Monastery of San Pedro de las Dueñas from 1126 to 1137.
 María González de Lara (died after 1141) married  Íñigo Jiménez, lord of Cameros and of the valley of Arnedo before June 1109, the year that they both executed a will. She appears with her son, also lord of Cameros confirming a donation made by his brother Rodrigo to the Monastery of San Pedro de Arlanza.''

Gonzalo could also have been the father of a Goto González who appears with her nephew Manrique Pérez de Lara in 1143 when he granted fuero to Los Ausines. Some genealogist claim that she was married to Rodrigo Muñoz, lord of Guzmán and Roa, although medieval sources confirm that Rodrigo's wife was Mayor Díaz.

Salazar y Castro added other daughters whose existence is undocumented and doubtful. One of them was Elvira González de Lara married to Pedro Núñez de Fuentearmegil, and another daughter named Sancha González who he claimed was the wife of Count Fernando Pérez de Traba, even though the documented wife of the count of Galicia was actually the daughter of Gonzalo Ansúrez and Urraca Bermúdez.

Notes

References

Bibliography

 

 
 
 
 
 
 
 

1106 deaths
Counts of Spain
Gonzalo
Castilian nobility
Year of birth unknown